Richard P. Gogan (29 November 1899 – 28 April 1982) was a member of the Irish Volunteers who fought in the 1916 Easter Rising. In later life, he became a Fianna Fáil politician.

Early and personal life
He was the son of William J. Gogan and was married to Kitty Gogan. He was one of the Guard of Honour at the funeral of Jeremiah O'Donovan Rossa in August 1915, and was present when  Patrick Pearse gave his famous speech at the graveside.

1916 Easter Rising
Gogan was a member of B company, 1st Battalion Irish Volunteers commanded by Edward Daly. He saw action at Cabra and at the General Post Office (GPO). On Easter Monday, 24 April 1916, he was part of a unit that were tasked to take control of three bridges into Dublin, at the North Circular Road, Cabra Road and Cross Guns Bridge on Phibsboro Road. They came under machine gun and artillery fire from nearby British military units, and an artillery piece sprayed their barricade with shrapnel after which they escaped and took shelter near Ben Eavin House in Glasnevin. At some point in the early hours of 25 April 1916, he left along with Jack Price, PJ Corless and his brother Vincent.

The next report of his participation in the Rising is at the GPO in O'Connell Street. Early in the morning of Friday 28 April, he volunteered as a stretcher-bearer to carry the wounded James Connolly out of the GPO, which was by then on fire. Under heavy machine-gun fire, he and two others (Sean Price and Paddy Ryan) carried Connolly to an Irish Volunteer position in a mineral water factory on Henry Place.

Prior to the Rising, there is a report of Gogan working in a bomb factory at a house called 'Cluny' in Clontarf which was used as an Irish Volunteers' munitions base.

Political career
He was a founding member of Fianna Fáil. Gogan was first elected to Dáil Éireann as a Fianna Fáil Teachta Dála (TD) for the Dublin North-West constituency at the 1954 general election, having previously unsuccessfully contested the 1948 and 1951 general elections. He held his seat at every subsequent election until losing at the 1977 general election in the new Dublin Cabra constituency.

References

1899 births
1982 deaths
Fianna Fáil TDs
Members of the 15th Dáil
Members of the 16th Dáil
Members of the 17th Dáil
Members of the 18th Dáil
Members of the 19th Dáil
Members of the 20th Dáil
Politicians from County Dublin